Bosc-Bordel is a commune in the Seine-Maritime department in the Normandy region in northern France.

The inhabitants of the town of Bosc-Bordel are called Bordelois, Bordeloises in French.

Geography

Population

Places of interest
 The church of St.Jean-Baptiste, dating from the thirteenth century.

See also
Communes of the Seine-Maritime department

References

Communes of Seine-Maritime